Emergency Police Centre of NAJA commonly known with its emergency telephone number as Police-110 is a dispatcher center of Law Enforcement Command of Islamic Republic of Iran which sends emergency responder units.

References 

Law enforcement in Iran
Law Enforcement Command of Islamic Republic of Iran
Emergency telephone numbers